Object animation is a form of stop motion animation that involves the animated movements of any non-drawn objects such as toys, blocks, dolls, and similar items which are not fully malleable, as plasticine (clay) or wax are, and not designed to look like recognizable human or animal characters.

Object animation is considered a different form of animation distinct from model animation and puppet animation, as these two forms of stop-motion animation generally use recognizable characters as their subjects, rather than pre-existing objects like static toy soldiers, or construction toys such as Tinkertoys, LEGO brand bricks (as with Brickfilm), Lincoln Logs, erector sets, Playmobil, and similar pre-formed objects.

Object animation is often combined with other forms of animation, typically for a more realistic effect. Model animation or puppet animation may be used to add more complex movement or depth to the object animation. For example, a toy car might be animated, either without, but more often with, a character clearly seen driving the car.

The use of animated objects in film has been present since the early days of cinema.

An example of modern object animation can be seen on Robot Chicken, part of the regular Adult Swim block on Cartoon Network, which combines object animation with a variation of puppet or model animation. In this case, the puppets are made to resemble plastic or action figures.

References

Animation techniques
Stop motion